XHJIM-FM is a radio station on 104.3 FM in Ciudad Jiménez, Chihuahua. The station is owned by Sergio Villarreal Lujan and carries a pop format known as Halcón Stereo.

History
XHJIM received its concession on September 23, 1992.

References

Radio stations in Chihuahua